Mroczki may refer to the following places:
Mroczki, Mińsk County in Masovian Voivodeship (east-central Poland)
Mroczki, Łomża County in Podlaskie Voivodeship (north-east Poland)
Mroczki, Mońki County in Podlaskie Voivodeship (north-east Poland)
Mroczki, Siedlce County in Masovian Voivodeship (east-central Poland)